The 2013–14 season was the 91st season in Elche’s history and the 20th in the top-tier.

Squad
As June, 2014..

Squad and statistics

|}

Transfers

Competitions

Overall

La Liga

Copa del Rey

References

Elche CF seasons
Elche CF